Coín is a town and municipality in the Province of Málaga, Spain, c. 33 km west of the provincial capital, Málaga, and about 30 km north of Marbella. The town has an official population of 22,000 inhabitants.

Foreigners now make up a substantial proportion of the town's inhabitants and are attracted to Coín because it is only 25 minutes from the beaches of Málaga and Marbella, including the 50 km stretch of coastline in between which includes the popular resorts of Torremolinos, Fuengirola and Benalmádena.

History
The town was ruled by the Moors and the Romans, with the Moors invading and controlling the town from 929 AD until 1485, when the Christians retook control of Coín and looted it.

Economy
The economy was traditionally agriculture, coexisting with marble mining (since Roman times) and ceramics. The latter has become very important and well-known during the twentieth century, having a colour of its own called "Green Coin". The most important ceramics workshop during the past century was the "Cumbreras" workshop and now local artisans continue this 300-year-old, traditional, ceramic craft.

Cinema city
The city of cinema was a project carried out in the area of Nacimiento to produce a television series, but was turned into a tourist area as well. For many years, Coín was the setting for several series, first the British Eldorado for the BBC, and after that the Andalusian serials "Plaza Alta" and "Arrayan", both recorded in Loasur studios produced by Linze TV, and shown by Canal Sur.
Tourism, construction, and the hospitality industry have replaced old industries, although there are still many potters and several quarries where local marble, dolomite rock and sand are produced for construction materials.

References

External links
 
 Website of tourism, culture, leisure in Coín

Municipalities in the Province of Málaga